The Influenza Research Database (IRD) is an integrative and comprehensive publicly available database and analysis resource to search, analyze, visualize, save and share data for influenza virus research. IRD is one of the five Bioinformatics Resource Centers (BRC) funded by the National Institute of Allergy and Infectious Diseases (NIAID), a component of the National Institutes of Health (NIH), which is an agency of the United States Department of Health and Human Services.

Data types in IRD 
 Segment, protein, and strain data
 Animal surveillance data
 Human clinical data
 Experimentally determined and predicted immune epitopes
 Sequence Features
 Predicted protein domains and motifs
 Gene Ontology annotations
 Computed sequence conservation score
 Clade classification for highly-pathogenic avian influenza H5N1 HA sequences
 3D protein structures
 PCR primer data curated from literature
 Experiment data from laboratory experiments and clinical trials
 Phenotypic characteristic data curated from literature
 Serology data
 Host factor data

Analysis and visualization tools in IRD 
 BLAST: provides custom IRD databases to identify the most related sequence(s)
 Short Peptide Search: allows users to find peptide sequences in target proteins
 Identify Point Mutations: identifies influenza proteins having particular amino acids at user-specified positions
 Multiple sequence alignment: allows users to align segment/protein sequences using MUSCLE
 Sequence Alignment Visualization: uses JalView for sequence alignment visualization
 Phylogenetic tree construction: calculates a tree using various algorithms and evolutionary models
 Phylogenetic Tree Visualization: allows the color-coded display of strain metadata on a tree generated with one of several available algorithms and/or evolutionary models and viewed with Archaeopteryx
 3D Protein Structure Visualization: integrates PDB protein structure files with sequence conservation score and IRD Sequence Features and provides an interactive 3D protein structure viewer using Jmol  
 Sequence Feature Variant Type (SFVT) analysis: provides a centralized repository of functional regions and automatically calculates all observed sequence variation within each defined region
 Metadata-driven Comparative Analysis Tool for Sequences (Meta-CATS): an automated comparative statistical analysis to identify positions that significantly differ between user-defined sequence groups
 Sequence Variation Analysis (SNP): pre-computed sequence variation analysis in all IRD sequences; also allows users to calculate the extent of sequence variation in user-specified sequences
 PCR Primers/Probes: provides a repository of commonly used primers for influenza virus identification, and calculates the polymorphisms of all related IRD sequences at the primer positions
 PCR Primer Design: allows PCR primer design for IRD and user-provided sequences
 Sequence annotation: determines the user-provided nucleotide sequence's influenza type, segment number and subtype (for segments 4 and 6), and translates the nucleotide sequence
 HPAI H5N1 Clade Classification: predicts the clade of highly pathogenic H5 HA sequences
 ReadSeq: converts between various sequence formats
 Data Submission Tool: allows users to submit influenza sequences, Sequence Features, and experimental data online
 External Analysis Tools: displays a list and description of third-party tools for more specialized analyses
 Personal Workbench to save and share data and analysis

References

External links 
 
 Bioinformatics Resource Centers The NIAID page describing the goals and activities of the BRCs

Influenza
Medical databases